Susan Denise Page (born 1964) is the Special Representative of the UN Secretary General for the United Nations Mission for Justice Support in Haiti (MINUJUSTH). Prior to this, she was the Deputy Special Representative for the Rule of Law at the United Nations Stabilization Mission in Haiti (MINUSTAH).

Education

She is a 1982 alumna of Homewood-Flossmoor High School in Flossmoor, Illinois. Page received an A.B. in English with high distinction from the University of Michigan and a J.D. from Harvard Law School. She has also studied at the University of St. Andrews in Scotland and conducted research on children and women's rights in Nepal through a Rotary International post-graduate fellowship.

Career

Page served as the first United States Ambassador to South Sudan, the Acting United States Ambassador to the African Union and the United Nations Economic Commission for Africa as well as in other diplomatic postings. In addition, she has served the United Nations and has held the positions of Director of the Rule of Law Advisory Unit in the United Nations Mission in the Sudan (UNMIS) and Senior Legal Adviser for the United Nations Development Programme (UNDP) in Sudan and in Rwanda.

Page's ambassadorial nomination was announced by the White House on August 18, 2011 and she was confirmed on October 18, 2011. She served in her role as U.S. Ambassador to South Sudan from October 2011 through July 2015.

Personal life 
Page is Catholic.

Page is a fan of the reality TV show  Survivor.

References

External links

Living people
Ambassadors of the United States to South Sudan
Harvard Law School alumni
University of Michigan College of Literature, Science, and the Arts alumni
Alumni of the University of St Andrews
African-American diplomats
American women ambassadors
1964 births
University of Michigan Law School faculty
American women academics
Homewood-Flossmoor High School alumni
21st-century African-American people
21st-century African-American women
21st-century American diplomats
20th-century African-American people
20th-century African-American women
African-American Catholics